The Corn Maiden and Other Nightmares is a collection of short stories and the title novella by Joyce Carol Oates. Published in 2011 by Mysterious Press, it contains several works that Oates had worked on over a period of fifteen years.

Synopsis
The book contains the stories "The Corn Maiden", "Beersheba", "Nobody Knows My Name", "Fossil-Figures", "Death-Cup", "Helping Hands", and "A Hole in the Head". The story contents range from a group of teenage girls planning to sacrifice one of their classmates in "The Corn Maiden" to a widow interacting with an employee of a second-hand store in "Helping Hands". Many contain the theme of sibling rivalry.

Reception
Critical reception for The Corn Maiden and Other Nightmares has been positive, with Kirkus Reviews calling the book "nightmarish". Publishers Weekly praised the book, calling Oates "a master of psychological dread" but wrote that the audio book's narrator Christine Williams "lacks the emotional punch and range displayed" by the book's other narrator. 
The Star Tribune and Bookreporter all praised the book, with Bookreporter praising the book's palpable anxiety.

References

2011 short story collections
American thriller novels
Works by Joyce Carol Oates
Mysterious Press books